Edward Schnell (June 3, 1830 - August 22, 1911) and Henry Schnell (August 4, 1834 - October 15, 1917) were brothers of Dutch extraction and German arms dealers active in Japan. After the enforced opening of Yokohama to foreign trade, Edward, who in the 1850s had served in the Prussian Army and spoke Malay, must have arrived in Japan no later than 1862, as he had a 7-year-old boy from his Japanese wife Kawai Tsugonusuke in 1869. He is also listed as owner of plot "No. 44" in Yokohama. He teamed up with the Swiss watch dealer François Perregaux presumably until 1867.
Henry served as secretary and translator to the Prussian consul Max von Brandt. While travelling in an open coach through Edo (modern Tokyo) in September 1867 the brothers were attacked by a samurai from Numata, who, by drawing his sword, in a private vendetta was trying to enforce the Sonnō jōi policy. The attacker was shot in the chest but managed to escape. While wildly shooting around the Schnells injured an innocent passer-by. The Japanese bodyguards provided by the Bakufu remained inactive. Von Brandt demanded that the attacker be executed, something the gaikoku-bugyō would not consent to. After much diplomatic wrangling the Prussian consul, realising that he had not the necessary military means, backed up and left it to the appropriate authorities of the samurai's Han to decide an appropriate punishment.

Document reliability

There are very few documents regarding the two brothers. Even the dates and places of their birth and death are unknown. They were from the Kingdom of Prussia, and raised in the Dutch East Indies (present day Indonesia). There is inconsistency also in Henry's name, varying from Henry Schnell, John Henry Schnell, I. Henry Schnell, and C. H. Schnell. Sometimes the two brothers are mistaken as the same person.

Boshin War
During the Boshin War in 1868–1869 Henry is known to have counselled the daimyō of Nagaoka, in Niigata, to whom he sold two Gatling guns (only one other existed in Japan at the time), 2,000 French rifles, and various other armaments. Troops seized Edward's storehouse in Niigata in 1869, and in a compromise brokered by the Dutch consul he received $ compensation in 1873. Apparently he lost most of his invested money in Germany during the economic crises of the late 1870s.

Aizu-Han
Edward and Henry Schnell also served the Aizu domain as a military instructor and procurer of weapons. Henry was granted the Japanese name , which inverted the characters of the daimyōs name . Hiramatsu (I. H. Schnell) was given the right to wear swords, as well as a residence in the castle town of Wakamatsu, a Japanese wife (the daughter of a Shōnai-han retainer), and retainers. In many contemporary references, he is portrayed as wearing a Japanese kimono, overcoat, and swords, with Western riding trousers and boots.

California
After Aizu's defeat, Henry, his Japanese wife and about two dozen disgruntled samurai established a 600-acre settlement in California. The Wakamatsu Silk and Tea Farm in what is nowadays El Dorado County was not economically viable, mainly because the samurai lacked the necessary skills (also social) to work the land. After two years Henry Schnell with his wife and daughter disappeared without further trace. Since 1969 this first Japanese settlement in the US has been marked by a commemorative plaque. In November 2010 the site was purchased by a land preservation society who plan to construct a museum. Kawashima Chūnosuke reported having met Edward in Geneva in 1885.

Depictions in media
The Boshin War and some of Henry's activities in Japan were dramatized in a 2015 TV movie, Samurai Warrior Queens.

See also
 List of foreign-born samurai in Japan

Further reading
Adachi Yoshio . Kaishō Suneru to Boshin Niigata kōbōsen . Niigata: Toyano Shuppan , 1985. (in Japanese)
 Weber, A.; Kontorrock und Konsulatsmütze; Hamburg 1886, Tokyo 1939 (novel, Edward as "General Schnurr")
 Saotome, Mitsugu; Hekigan no Aizu-Bushi; in: Rekishi e no Shōtai, Nr. 2 (1979), p. 125–164 (in Japanese)
 Stahncke, Holmer; Die Brüder Schnell und der Bürgerkrieg in Nordjapan; Tokyo, Dt. Ges. für Natur- und Völkerkunde Ostasiens, 1986, 48 p. (in German)
 Takashi, Yoshio; Kaishō Schnell; Tokyo 1983 (in Japanese)

References

External links 
 Wakamatsu Tea and Silk Farm Colony at Gold Hill

German expatriates in Japan
German expatriates in Indonesia
German businesspeople
German people of Dutch descent
Meiji Restoration
People of the Boshin War
1830s births
Year of death unknown